was a samurai of the late Edo period who went on to become an educator and politician in the Meiji era.

Biography 

Ebara was born in Edo as the son of a lesser retainer of the Tokugawa shogunate, but was an exceptionally talented scholar and selected for the Shogunal military academy based on his performance at the terakoya temple schools.

Following his combat service at the Battle of Toba–Fushimi during the Boshin War of the Meiji Restoration, he visited the United States. On his return to Japan, he moved to Shizuoka prefecture to be near the former shōgun Tokugawa Yoshinobu and assisted in establishing the Numazu Military Academy and Numazu Junior High School. Converting to Christianity in 1877, he was responsible for starting the Numazu Church. Later, Ebara served as chairman of the Tokyo YMCA.

In 1890, Ebara was elected in the 1890 Japanese general election to the House of Representatives in the Diet of Japan and served as a member of the Liberal Party, the Kenseikai, and the Rikken Seiyūkai. In 1912, he was appointed to the House of Peers. He was sent to the United States to try to ease tension over California's Alien Land Law of 1913.

Ebara is also remembered as the founder of Azabu High School (then a middle school).

Ebara died of a cerebral hemorrhage.

References

External links 
 Biographical sketch and data on the Azabu High School 
 Biographical information 
 Biographical Data 
http://www.lib.city.minato.tokyo.jp/yukari/e/man-detail.cgi?
 NY Times Obit

1842 births
1922 deaths
Japanese Methodists
Japanese educators
Members of the House of Peers (Japan)
People of the Boshin War
Samurai
People of Meiji-period Japan
Members of the House of Representatives (Empire of Japan)
Liberal Party (Japan, 1881) politicians
Kenseikai politicians
Rikken Seiyūkai politicians
YMCA leaders